Premio Tusquets de Novela is a literary prize promoted by the Spanish Tusquets Editores, for writers in Spanish language. First awarded in the 2005 Feria Internacional del Libro de Guadalajara.

The prize consists of a financial award, which in 2012 was 20.000 euros, as well as a small bronze statue designed by the sculptor Joaquim Camps. The work is published simultaneously in Argentina, Spain and Mexico.

In its brief history there have been no winners in 2005 and 2008.

Prize winners

Prize finalists

References

External links
Premio Tusquets Editores de Novela in Tusquets Editores website.

Spanish literary awards